Alfred Paget was an actor.

Alfred Paget may also refer to:
Lord Alfred Paget (1816–1888), British soldier and courtier
Alfred Paget (Royal Navy officer) (1852–1918), British admiral

See also
Alfred Paget Hedges, MP for Tunbridge